

Coobowie is a town in the Australian state of South Australia near the south-eastern tip of Yorke Peninsula. Coobowie was proclaimed in 1875. Coobowie comes from an Aboriginal word meaning "wild fowl water". At the 2011 census, Coobowie shared a population of 220 with other localities. Coobowie's current outlook is to create many new features including making improvements to the foreshore play area.

The protected area known as the Coobowie Aquatic Reserve is partly located within Coobowie with the remainder being located in the adjoining bay, Salt Creek Bay.

See also
 List of cities and towns in South Australia
Port Giles, South Australia

References

External links 
  Yorke Peninsula website

Yorke Peninsula
Coastal towns in South Australia
Gulf St Vincent